John L. Magruder (June 3, 1887 – April 30, 1958) was a Brigadier general in the U.S. Army. Among his offices was that of Deputy Director for Intelligence for the Office of Strategic Services.

Biography

John Magruder was born on June 3, 1887, in Woodstock, Virginia. He attended Virginia Military Institute and graduated in 1909. He was commissioned a second lieutenant in infantry in 1910. He was transferred to the field artillery branch of the army in the next year.

During World War I, Magruder served with the 112th Field Artillery within the American Expeditionary Forces in France.

After the war Magruder was transferred to China, where he was appointed an assistant military attaché in Beijing. He served in this capacity until 1924, when he was assigned for study at Command and General Staff College at Fort Leavenworth, Kansas. After his graduation, Magruder was transferred back to Beijing, now in the new capacity of military attaché.

During World War II Magruder served in the Office of Strategic Services (OSS), as deputy director under the leadership of General William J. Donovan. After the war, the OSS was disbanded. Core elements of it, however, were maintained in the new Strategic Services Unit (SSU), located in the then Department of War. This newly formed SSU was led by General Magruder. Magruder played a formative role in the creation of the civilian Central Intelligence Agency (CIA) in 1947, which absorbed the SSU.

Decorations

Notes

1887 births
1958 deaths
Military personnel from Virginia
United States Army generals of World War II
People of the Office of Strategic Services
People from Woodstock, Virginia
Recipients of the Distinguished Service Medal (US Army)
United States Army Command and General Staff College alumni
United States Army generals
United States Army War College alumni
Virginia Military Institute alumni
United States Army personnel of World War I